Glenbow Ranch Provincial Park is a provincial park in the Calgary Region of Alberta, Canada. The majority of the park is located on the north bank of the Bow River within Rocky View County. Portions of the eastern and western extremities of the park are located within the City of Calgary and the Town of Cochrane respectively.

History 
Plans to establish Glenbow Ranch Provincial Park began in 2006 when the children of Alberta rancher Neil Harvie sold  of land to the Government of Alberta for less than market value to conserve the land and protect it from development. Appraised at $67 million in 2005 and with an estimated value of $80 million in 2006, the land was sold to the province for $40 million and a $27 million charitable tax receipt. Under the deal, the Harvie family also established a $6 million foundation to promote and develop the park and Lois Hole Centennial Provincial Park near Edmonton. 

Glenbow Ranch was officially designated as a provincial park by an order in council on April 17, 2008. The park officially opened to visitors on August 9, 2011.

See also
List of Alberta provincial parks
List of Canadian provincial parks
List of National Parks of Canada

References

External links 
Glenbow Ranch Provincial Park
Alberta Parks – Glenbow Ranch Provincial Park
Glenbow Ranch Park Foundation

Provincial parks of Alberta
Calgary Region
Rocky View County
Parks in Calgary